Christopher Stadnyk is a Canadian international lawn bowler.

Bowls career
Stadnyk won the bronze medal in the triples with Keith Roney and Hiren Bhartu at the 2008 World Outdoor Bowls Championship in Christchurch.

He has won four medals at the Asia Pacific Bowls Championships, two silver and two bronze.

In November 2017, Stadnyk was named to Canada's 2018 Commonwealth Games team.

References

1974 births
Canadian male bowls players
Living people
Bowls players at the 2018 Commonwealth Games
Bowls players at the 2014 Commonwealth Games
Commonwealth Games competitors for Canada